Echoes and Artifacts (2001) is a compilation album of songs by The Crüxshadows.

It includes two covers; T-Rex's "Ballrooms of Mars" and the Eurythmics' "Here Comes the Rain Again".

Track listing

Credits 
 Guitar - Kevin Page, Stacey Campbell, Tim Curry
 Keyboards - Sean Flanagan
 Keyboards, Technician [Analog Modeling] - Chris Brantley
 Keyboards, Violin - Rachel McDonnell
 Mastered By - Rogue, Trevor Brown
 Vocals, Programmed By, Sequenced By, Other [Etc.] - Rogue
 Written By - Rogue Or Rogue & The Crüxshadows (tracks: 1 to 4, 6 to 7, 9 to 11), Marc Bolan (track 5), Annie Lennox, Dave Stewart (track 8)

References

2001 albums
2004 albums
The Crüxshadows albums